The Shadow Ministry of Tony Abbott was the opposition Coalition shadow ministry of Australia from December 2009 to September 2013, opposing the Australian Labor Party governments of Kevin Rudd and Julia Gillard.

The shadow ministry is a group of senior Opposition spokespeople who form an alternative Cabinet to the government's, whose members shadow or mark each individual Minister or portfolio of the Government.

Since the 2007 federal election, the Liberal–National Coalition had been the Official Opposition, initially led by Brendan Nelson and later Malcolm Turnbull. In 2009, Tony Abbott defeated Turnbull in a leadership spill 42 votes to 41 in the second round and took on the role of Opposition Leader.

The Abbott shadow ministry was the first in which shadow ministers received additional pay for their roles, taking effect from 2012 after a decision of the Gillard government.

Structure 
The "opposition front bench" comprises the full shadow ministry including the shadow cabinet, other shadow ministers and shadow parliamentary secretaries.
As an institution, the shadow cabinet is much less defined—or studied—than the Cabinet with its well established formal procedures. Shadow Cabinet operates more as a committee of an opposition political party than an institution of Government or Parliament. The Cabinet Handbook was first published in 1926 and the updated version is available on-line but no such equivalent exists for Shadow Cabinet.

First arrangement (2009–2010) 
The Shadow Cabinet of Tony Abbott was created following the accession of Tony Abbott to the leadership in December 2009. It remained largely unchanged until the 2010 election, excluding one minor reshuffle in March 2010. After this reshuffle, Barnaby Joyce gained the Regional Development portfolio from Warren Truss and the Infrastructure and Water Portfolio from Ian Macfarlane. Andrew Robb took on Joyce's previous portfolio of Finance and Deregulation and Macfarlane gained the Energy and Resources portfolio from the retiring Nick Minchin.

Shadow Cabinet

Members of the Outer Shadow Ministry

Shadow Parliamentary Secretaries

Second arrangement (2010–2013) 
Tony Abbott reshuffled the Shadow Cabinet following the 2010 election and this arrangement remained largely unchanged until the election of the Abbott government in 2013. Two alterations were made during this period. In March 2011, Michael Ronaldson was appointed Shadow Minister Assisting the Leader of the Opposition on the Centenary of ANZAC. A wider redistribution took place in September 2012 following the resignation of Cory Bernardi. Arthur Sinodinos took on the role of Shadow Parliamentary Secretary Assisting the Leader of the Opposition and Jamie Briggs took on the role of Shadow Parliamentary Secretary of Supporting Families. Michaelia Cash was also appointed Deputy Manager of Opposition Business in the Senate.

Shadow Cabinet

Members of the Outer Shadow Ministry

Shadow Parliamentary Secretaries (2009–2013)

Other positions

See also 
 First Rudd Ministry
 First Gillard Ministry
 Second Gillard Ministry
 Second Rudd Ministry
 Abbott Ministry

References

External links 
 Parliament of Australia, Official current Shadow Ministry list
 Shadow Ministry, 

Australia, Shadow Cabinet
Opposition of Australia
Abbott
Liberal Party of Australia